Smrdan may refer to:

 Smrdan (Leskovac), a village in Serbia
 Smrdan (Prokuplje), a village in Serbia